The Somali pygmy gerbil (Microdillus peeli) is a species of rodent in the family Muridae.  It is the only species in the genus Microdillus.  It is found only in Somalia. Its natural habitat is subtropical or tropical dry shrubland.

References

Gerbils
Endemic fauna of Somalia
Mammals described in 1898
Taxonomy articles created by Polbot
Taxa named by William Edward de Winton